İclaliye can refer to:

 İclaliye, İnegöl
 İclaliye, Susurluk